Events from the year 1765 in France

Incumbents
Monarch: Louis XV

Events
École nationale vétérinaire d'Alfort founded
The Hennessy cognac house founded

Births
 11 January – Antoine Alexandre Barbier, librarian (died 1825)
 7 March – Nicéphore Niépce, inventor, pioneer photographer (died 1833)
 26 July – Jean-Baptiste Drouet, Comte d'Erlon, marshal (died 1844)
 4 August – Claire Lacombe, actress and revolutionary
 1 September – Étienne Pellot, "le Renard Basque", corsair (died 1856)
 15 October – Joseph Dutens, engineer (died 1848)
 17 November – Jacques MacDonald, marshal (died 1840)
 3 December – Adélaïde Dufrénoy, poet and painter from Brittany (died 1825)
 Approximate date – James Smithson, British chemist, mineralogist and posthumous founder of the Smithsonian Institution in the United States (died 1829 in Italy)

Deaths
 
 23 February – Jean Girard, organist (born 1696)
 15 April – Élisabeth Alexandrine de Bourbon, princess (born 1705)
 29 June – François Dominique Barreau de Chefdeville, architect (born 1725)
 5 September – Anne Claude de Caylus, antiquarian, proto-archaeologist and man of letters (born 1692)
 26 September – Jean-Baptiste Bénard de la Harpe, explorer of North America (born 1683)
 Date unknown – Louis-Antoine Dornel, composer (born c.1685)

See also

References

1760s in France